The Metropolis of Cluj, Maramureș and Sălaj is a metropolis of the Romanian Orthodox Church. Its see is the Archdiocese of Vad, Feleac and Cluj; its suffragan dioceses are Maramureș and Sătmar and Sălaj. The headquarters is the Dormition Cathedral in Cluj-Napoca. It covers northern Transylvania and southern Maramureș. It was established in March 2006 when its territory was removed from the jurisdiction of the Metropolis of Transylvania.

Metropolitan bishops
Bartolomeu Anania (March 2006 – January 2011)
Andrei Andreicuț (March 2011-)

Notes

External links
 Official site

 
Cluj
2006 establishments in Romania
Religion in Transylvania
Maramureș